Kooralbyn is a rural locality in the Scenic Rim Region, Queensland, Australia.

Geography

Kooralbyn is commonly referred to as the Valley by its residents due to the former name Kooralbyn Valley.

History
Kooralbyn is a Yugambeh word meaning the place of the copperhead snake.

First European settlement in the area can be traced back to the 1830s when southern timber millers sought the quality hardwoods of the lower valleys. It was not until Australia's first major land booms in the 1840s that free settler pastoralists migrated to the region. Kooralbyn subsequently became one of the region's most significant pastoral estates, the land used largely for cattle grazing.

Kooralbyn International School opened on 30 January 1985.

The locality contained 820 households, in which 49.9% of the population were male and 50.1% of the population were female with a median age of 46, 8 years above the national average. The average weekly household income was $844, $594 below the national average. 5.2% of Kooralbyn's population were either of Aborigional or Torres Strait Islander descent. 60.1% of the population aged 15 or over were either registered or de facto married, while 39.9% of the population were not married. 27.7% of the population were attending some form of a compulsory education. The most common nominated ancestries were English (32.5%), Australian (28.2%) and Irish (9.0%), while the most common country of birth was Australia (71.7%), and the most commonly spoken language at home was English (89.4%). The most common nominated religions were No religion (32.2%), Anglican (22.8%) and Catholic (16.2%). The most common occupation was a technician/trades worker (18.1%) and the majority/plurality of residents worked 40 or more hours per week (43.0%).

Education 
The Kooralbyn International School is a private primary and secondary (Prep-12) school for boys and girls at Ogilvie Place. In 2017, the school had an enrolment of 285 students with 24 teachers (21 full-time equivalent) and 24 non-teaching staff (16 full-time equivalent).

There are no government schools in Kooralbyn. The nearest government primary schools are in Tamrookum and Boonah. The nearest government secondary schools are in Boonah and Beaudesert.

Amenities 
The locality has a shopping complex (with real estate, fuel, groceries and other conveniences), a hotel, an 18-hole golf course, polo fields, an airstrip, a light commercial area, mini golf, tennis, self-contained accommodation, the Kooralbyn International School, and other facilities.

The Scenic Rim Regional Council operates a mobile library service which visits Salisbury Avenue.

Resort
In 1979, work began on a resort that featured a diverse range of recreational facilities. 55 hillside holiday houses were completed in 1982 and designed by Harry Seidler. 
In 1991 a new hotel was added to the resort. In July 2008 the resort and golf course closed and went into liquidation. In June 2014 Peter Huang, founder of the Yong Real Estate group, settled on the purchase of the Kooralbyn Resort.

After a lengthy restoration costing over $7m, the newly-renamed Ramada Resort Kooralbyn Valley re-opened to visitors in June 2016.

References

External links

 
Kooralbyn Hotel Resort Official site

Scenic Rim Region
Populated places established in 1980
Localities in Queensland